Minor Chapel A. M. E. Church is a historic African Methodist Episcopal church on the east side of Jefferson Street between Red Row Alley and Reasor Street in Taylorsville, Kentucky. It was built in about 1895 and added to the National Register in 1992.

It is a wood-frame church on a dry-laid limestone foundation.

References

African Methodist Episcopal churches in Kentucky
Churches on the National Register of Historic Places in Kentucky
National Register of Historic Places in Spencer County, Kentucky
Chapels in the United States
Churches in Spencer County, Kentucky
Buildings and structures in Taylorsville, Kentucky
1895 establishments in Kentucky
Churches completed in 1895